Daudpur is a market town in the Saran district of Bihar located on NH-85 (Chapra Siwan Gopalganj Highway),  West of Chhapra,  connected by railways (station code DDP).

References

Cities and towns in Saran district